X Corps was a corps of the United States Army in World War II and the Korean War.

World War II
The X Corps was activated in May 1942 at Sherman, Texas. Elements of the corps embarked aboard Klipfontein, a Dutch ship operating under charter through the War Shipping Administration for the Army. The ship departed the San Francisco Port of Embarkation for the Pacific Theater 14 July 1944 after two changes of station and participation in maneuvers in Louisiana and at the California-Arizona maneuver area.

X Corps took part in the following campaigns: New Guinea, Leyte, and Southern Philippines.

As part of the Sixth Army, X Corps took part in the Philippines campaign of 1944–45, beginning with the invasion of Leyte. For its involvement, the X Corps received the Philippine Presidential Unit Citation with a streamer embroidered 17 October 1944 – 4 July 1945.

X Corps became inactive in 1946.

Korean War

Inchon landing

During the Korean War, it took part in Operation Chromite, the landings at Inchon, where it had the 1st Marine Division, the 7th Infantry Division and other US Army units under its command. The embryonic planning group for Chromite originally was known to insiders as "Force X" and the entire scheme was cloaked in absolute secrecy; to outsiders, the small planning staff was known only as the Special Planning Staff of general headquarters, Far East Command. As the organization grew, due to bureaucratic entanglements, supply orders were rejected because "Force X" was not referenced as a proper organization anywhere in Army manuals. General of the Army Douglas MacArthur (Supreme Commander Allied Powers) asked his chief of staff, Major General Edward Almond, to suggest a new name. Force X's Roman numeral ten reminded Almond of a corps which had fought under MacArthur in the last war—"why not call it the X Corps?" he asked. MacArthur was delighted and approved of the name. General Almond was subsequently chosen by MacArthur as X Corps' new commander.

The Marines first captured an island offshore of Inchon as a prelude to the assault and at the next tide, the main attack went in. Despite the noise of the attack on the offshore island, it completely surprised the North Korean Korean People's Army (KPA) forces. The Marines then moved on to the capital city of Seoul; in heavy fighting they eventually drove out the KPA defenders. The US Army's 7th Infantry Division, which had landed later at Inchon, engaged the enemy on the outskirts of Seoul, destroying an armored regiment.

Operations in northeast Korea (October–December 1950)
After the landing at Inchon, X Corps attacked up the Korean peninsula on the left flank of Eighth Army. However, in early October it was withdrawn to prepare for another amphibious assault, this time at Wonsan on the eastern coast. This action proved to be a mistake as Republic of Korea Army (ROK) forces moving by land captured Wonsan on 11 October before the X Corps assault went in. The Chinese People's Volunteer Army (PVA) entered the war on the side of North Korea, making their first attacks in late October.

After an administrative landing at Wonsan on 26 October, X Corps, now including the US 3rd Infantry Division, advanced inland northwest towards the Yalu River with the ROK I Corps made up of two ROK Divisions in the far north or right flank. The US 7th Infantry Division was in the center and the US 1st Marine Division on the southern or left flank of the X Corps attack. The 3rd Infantry Division was initially in reserve. As elements of ROK I Corps and 7th Infantry Division closed on the Manchurian border, the 1st Marine Division moved into the Chosin Reservoir (Changjin Ho). The Marines were on both left and right sides of the Changjin reservoir. Regimental Combat Team 31 (RCT 31 also known as Task Force Maclean/Task Force Faith) of the 7th Infantry Division replaced the 5th Marine Regiment on the east side of the reservoir in a piecemeal fashion with only two of its three maneuver battalions in place before heavy engagement with the enemy commenced. X Corps was strung out along many miles in sub-freezing temperatures with the ROK troops and the 7th Infantry Division to the north in contact with PVA forces. RCT 31 was too far from its parent Division for support and without organic tank support and its third maneuver element; it was decimated by the onslaught of the PVA. The 1st Marine Division fared better and with remnants of RCT 31, Army Engineers and X Corps support personnel, began its move to the sea moving through elements of the 3rd Infantry Division (Task Force Dog from the 7th Infantry Regiment, and a reinforced battalion of the 65th Infantry Regiment) who provided flank and rear guard cover for the withdrawing units. The 7th Infantry Division in the center and ROK I Corps on the right flank also began withdrawing to the Hungnam beachhead. The Marines withdrew through the 3d Infantry Division with intermittent contact with PVA forces up to Sudong. The extreme temperatures during this period caused the majority of the casualties for X Corps. The Marines managed to reach the safety of Hungnam first, where the 3rd and 7th Infantry Divisions and I ROK Corps provided perimeter defense. The Marines were evacuated by the middle of December, followed by the 7th Infantry Division, I ROK Corps and the last of the X Corps' elements. The 3d Infantry Division was last to leave the beach and evacuated on 24 December 1950.

It is widely contended that X Corps remained outside of the direct command of Eighth Army too long. X Corps reported directly to the MacArthur had been necessary for the Inchon landings and still defensible for the Wonsan attack. However, after it entered the main line, conventional military doctrine indicated that it should have been placed immediately under the command of Eighth Army. General MacArthur was accused of favoritism towards Almond, the controversial commander of X Corps, who was dual-hatted as the commander of X Corps and MacArthur's chief of staff and his personal friend.

Operations on the eastern front
After the withdrawal from the northeast coast, and once its units had been reconstituted, X Corps went into the line in eastern Korea, and remained there for the rest of the war.

Post-Korean War
In the years following the Korean War, X Corps served as a regional headquarters, having administrative, logistical, and training responsibility for both active and Army Reserve units in the northwestern portion of the Continental United States.

X Corps was inactivated on 31 March 1968, as part of the compromise between U.S. Secretary of Defense Robert S. McNamara who wanted to merge the Army Reserve into the Army National Guard, and the United States Congress who wanted to maintain the Army Reserve as it then existed. Under the compromise plan, all of the combat divisions and most separate combat brigades of the Army Reserve were inactivated with a corresponding increase in the National Guard; at the same time, non-divisional combat support and combat service support units were reallocated in the Army Reserve. The fourteen area corps were inactivated; in their place, eighteen army reserve commands ("ARCOMs") were established. Each ARCOM was, in turn, assigned to one of five continental U.S. armies ("CONUSAs") under Continental Army Command ("CONARC"). The bulk of X Corps' Army Reserve units were assigned to the 124th Army Reserve Command at Fort Lawton, WA.

In popular culture
The US Army Tenth Corps is the name of the main field force featured in Harold Coyle's 1993 techno-thriller "The Ten Thousand". In the novel its ground combat elements are the 55th Mechanized Infantry Division, the 4th Armored Division and the 14th Armored Cavalry Regiment.

Commanders
Major General Courtney Hodges; May 1942 to February 1943
Major General Jonathan W. Anderson; March 1943 to July 1944
Major General Franklin C. Sibert; August 1944 to 31 January 1946 (X Corps inactivated.)
Lieutenant General Edward Almond; 26 August 1950 to 15 July 1951
Major General Clovis E. Byers; 15 July 1951 to 5 December 1951
Lieutenant General Williston B. Palmer; 5 December 1951 to 15 August 1952
Lieutenant General Isaac D. White; 7 November 1952 to 27 April 1955 (X Corps inactivated.)

Notable former members
William E. Butterworth III, served with headquarters as an information officer based in Kwandae-ri.

References

10
10
Military units and formations established in 1942
USCorps0010
Military units and formations of the United States in the Cold War
Military units and formations disestablished in 1968
United States